Sargodha may refer to:

Places 
Sargodha, a city situated in Pakistan
Sargodha District, a district of Punjab (Pakistan)
Sargodha Tehsil, a tehsil of district Sargodha
Sargodha Division, an administrative unit of Punjab (Pakistan)
Sargodha Cantonment, a cantonment in Pakistan

Education
University of Sargodha, a university in Pakistan.
not to be confused with:
Sargodha Medical College, a medical college in Pakistan.
Sargodha Institute of Technology, a technical institute in Pakistan.

Other uses
Sargodha cricket team, a local domestic cricket team.
Sargodha Junction railway station, a railway station in Pakistan.

See also
Sargodar-e Kalatu, village in Iran.